A fissure is a narrow crack or opening in the Earth's surface

Fissure or fissures may also refer to:

Anatomy and healthcare
 Fissure (anatomy), a groove, natural division, deep furrow, elongated cleft, or tear in various parts of the body
 Fissure (botany), a split or crack; a line or opening of dehiscence.
 Fissure (dentistry), a break in the tooth enamel
 Sulcus (morphology), furrow or groove in the surface of a limb or an organ
 Sulcus (neuroanatomy), a large depression or groove in the cerebral cortex

Geology
 Fissure vein, a vein of ore aggregated in a fissure
 Fissure vent, a linear volcanic vent through which lava erupts, usually without any explosive activity
 Ice fissure, deep fracture or crevasse in glaciology

Art and entertainment
 Fissures (album), a 1997 album by Robert Rich and Alio Die
 Fissures (film), a 2009 film

People
 Fissure (gamer), online alias of professional esports player Baek Chan-hyung

See also